Events from the year 1953 in Denmark.

Incumbents
 Monarch – Frederick IX
 Prime minister – Erik Eriksen (until 30 September), Hans Hedtoft

Events
In 1953 the Danish constitution was amended, allowing for female succession to the throne. King Frederick IX's eldest daughter (and child) Princess Margrethe, replaced her uncle Prince Knud as heir-presumptive.

Sports

Badminton
 22  March  Marie U. Nylen wins gold in Women's Single at the All England Badminton Championships

Cycling
  Lucien Gillen (LUX) and  Ferdinando Terruzzi (ITA) win the Six Days of Copenhagen sox-day track cycling race.

Football
 20 January  Boldklubben Avarta is founded.

Births
 26 January – Anders Fogh Rasmussen, politician, Prime Minister of Denmark 2001–09, Secretary General of NATO 2009–14
 19 March – Jørgen Emborg, jazz pianist
 15 April – Frank Andersen, ballet dancer, choreographer and ballet master
 11 September – Lars H.U.G., musician and painter

Deaths
 17 January – Hans Peter Hansen, journalist and politician (born 1872)
 14 February – Carl Brummer, architect (born 1864)
 27 July – Jørgen Arenholt, tennis player, competitor at the 1912 Summer Olympics (born 1876)

References

 
Denmark
Years of the 20th century in Denmark
1950s in Denmark
1953 in Europe